The Corrida de Langueux is an annual 10 kilometres road running competition which is held in Langueux, Brittany, France every June. The competition is organised by the Union Athlétique Langueux. The elite 10K races for men and women have IAAF Bronze Label Road Race status. The race was selected to be the French 10K championship race in 2003, 2008 and 2010.

There are elite and popular races over 10 km, as well as a races for younger athletes and wheelchair racers. Furthermore, an annual 20 km hike (la randonnée) is held in conjunction with the running events. The hike takes walkers across the Bay of Saint-Brieuc at low tide and then through the peninsula of Hillion. In 2009 over 500 people took part in the hike, over 450 young runners took part in the youth race, and over 850 runners ran the popular 10K race. In total, the day's events attract almost 2000 participants every year, from elite runners to disabled athletes. On top of this, around 15,000 spectators watch the race in the centre of the village – a number which is twice the population of Langueux.

The course is double-looped and encompasses the village centre, passing points of interest including the Langueux church and sports complex. Past winners of the race include 1998 Olympic fourth placer Jean-Louis Prianon, World Championship marathon runner Nadia Ejjafini, and 2006 Lille Half Marathon winner Meriem Wangari.

The course records for the race are 27:46 minutes for men, set by Atsedu Tsegay in 2011, and 31:20 minutes for women, set by Clémence Calvin in 2018.

Past elite 10K winners
Key:

References

List of winners
Resultats . Corrida de Langueux. Retrieved on 2010-06-29.

External links
Official website 

Recurring sporting events established in 1991
10K runs
Athletics competitions in France
Sport in Côtes-d'Armor
Annual sporting events in France
1991 establishments in France
Summer events in France